Gertrude Schoepperle  (July 15, 1882 – December 11, 1921) was an American university professor and a scholar of medieval Celtic, French, and German literature.

Biography
Gertrude Schoepperle was born in Oil City, Pennsylvania, July 15, 1882. Her parents were Vinzens Schoepperle, of Rötenbach, Germany, and Elizabeth Klein, of Kittanning, Pennsylvania.

Schoepperle attended Oil City High School. She studied at Wellesley College, Radcliffe College, before traveling abroad to continue her studies in Munich, Paris (with Ferdinand Lot, Joseph Bédier, and Marie Henri d'Arbois de Jubainville), and Dublin. She graduated with a Ph.D. in 1909, at Radcliffe College, with the thesis of "Studies on the Origin of the Tristan Romance".

From 1912 to 1913 she taught German at New York University. From 1911 to 1919, she taught in the English Department at the University of Illinois at Urbana–Champaign and established a strong Celtic studies program. From 1919 to 1921, she taught French at Vassar College.

Schoepperle married Roger Sherman Loomis in August 1919. She died in Poughkeepsie, New York, December 11, 1921, and is buried at Prospect Lawn Cemetery, in Hamburg, New York.

Selected works
 Arthur in Avalon and the Banshee.
 Chievrefoil, 1909
 The love-potion in Tristan and Isolt, 1910
 The Island combat in "Tristan.", 1910
 Sur un yers de la Folie Tristan de Berne, 1911
 Tristan and Isolt, a study of the sources of the romance by Gertrude Schoepperle, 1913
 Folk-ballads of Southern Europe, 1914
 Irish Studies at the University of Illinois, 1918
 The Washer of the Ford, 1919
 John Arnott Macculloch, 1920
 Etude sur le Lancelot en prose, 1921
 John Synge and His Old French Farce, 1921
 The old French "Lai de Nabaret", 1922

References

Bibliography
 
 

1882 births
1921 deaths
American medievalists
People from Oil City, Pennsylvania
20th-century American non-fiction writers
20th-century American women writers
Wellesley College alumni
Radcliffe College alumni
New York University faculty
University of Illinois Urbana-Champaign faculty
Vassar College faculty
American women academics